Aleksandr Nossov; born October 22, 1942 in Perm) was a Soviet nordic combined skier who competed in the 1970s. He finished seventh in the Nordic combined event at the 1972 Winter Olympics in Sapporo.

External links
Olympic nordic combined results: 1968-84.

1942 births
Sportspeople from Perm, Russia
Nordic combined skiers at the 1972 Winter Olympics
Soviet male Nordic combined skiers
Living people
Olympic Nordic combined skiers of the Soviet Union